Glories may refer to:
 The plural of the English word glory
Glòries, a usual shortened form of Plaça de les Glòries Catalanes, a major square in Barcelona.